The first Cowper ministry was the second ministry of the Colony of New South Wales, and was led by Charles Cowper. It was the first of five occasions that Cowper was Leader of the Government. Cowper was elected in the first free elections for the New South Wales Legislative Assembly held in March 1856, and fought unsuccessfully with Stuart Donaldson to form Government. When Donaldson's Government faltered a little over two months after it was formed, Cowper formed Government.

The title of Premier was widely used to refer to the Leader of Government, but not enshrined in formal use until 1920.

There was no party system in New South Wales politics until 1887. Under the constitution, ministers were required to resign to recontest their seats in a by-election when appointed. Charles Cowper and Robert Campbell were comfortably re-elected in the by election for Sydney City. James Martin (Cook and Westmoreland) and Terence Murray (Southern Boroughs) were re-elected unopposed.

This ministry covers the period from 26 August 1856 until on 2 October 1856, when Cowper resigned his commission, having lost the confidence of the Assembly.

Composition of ministry

 
Ministers are members of the Legislative Assembly unless otherwise noted.

See also

Self-government in New South Wales
Members of the New South Wales Legislative Assembly, 1856–1858
Second Cowper ministry (1857–1859)
Third Cowper ministry (1861–1863)
Fourth Cowper ministry (1865–1866)
Fifth Cowper ministry (1870)

References

 

New South Wales ministries
1856 establishments in Australia
1856 disestablishments in Australia